Calumpang National High School (CNHS), formerly Calumpang Public High School, is a public secondary high school in Nagcarlan, Laguna, Philippines, established on July 14, 1966.

Administration

Principal
 Josefa Orijola

Department Heads

English Coordinator: Mrs. Jhoana A. Suaze
Filipino Coordinator: 
Mathematics Coordinator: Mr. Jonathan O. Dela Cruz
Science Coordinator: Mrs. Gina Escano
Social Studies Coordinator: Mrs. Mylin K. Orphiano
Technology and Livelihood Education (TLE) Coordinator: Mrs. Lizette B. Mangilin
Information and Communications Technology (ICT) Coordinator: Mr. Arnel D. Mangilin
ESP Coordinator: Ms. Buenagay Crisostomo
Music, Arts, Physical Education and Health (MAPEH) Coordinator: Mrs. Marilyn Bagabagon
School Paper Coordinator/Advisers: Ms. Cherry Bell Calahatian (English) and Ms. Mylyn Elisan (Filipino)

Student organizations

 Supreme Student Government Organization (SSG-O)  – Headed by Roby L. Almario as the President, SSG-O governs the students of CNHS. They hold various festivities including the CNHS Foundation Week, Teachers’ Day Celebration, Christmas Party and Valentine’s Day Celebration.
 Techno Club – The Techno Club organization covers all activities related to TLE Department. They contribute on the school development by holding projects for cleanliness and orderliness such as Project SAMA or "Silid Aralang Malinis, Maayos at Maganda".
 Red Cross Youth – A neutral organization that performs various programs including the Leadership Development training, first aid training and outreach activities. It is also headed by Zyra Alexie A. Monfero as their President.
 Youth for Environment in Schools Organization (YES-O) and Science Club  – This organization was led by Kclyn O. Gumban as the President. YES-O and Science is the organization that focuses more on environment of school and community. 
 Theatro Filipino: A group of talented CNHS students that performs Theater Art inside and outside the campus. Their stage play “Bakit Babae ang Naghuhugas ng Pinggan” is one of the notable performances held in different locations in Laguna.
 SAMAFIL – An organization for Filipino Students. Abbreviated from “Samahan ng mga Mag-aaral sa Filipino” 
 Math  Club
 English Club - Led by Andrea Elvira Marie Vallente as the President.
 MAPEH Club
 Samahang Araling Funlipunan - A school organization headed by Gabriel Matthew P. Lopez as the President. The SAF is also leads school activities Flag Raising and Retreats also the organization is participating in community projects.

Curriculum

Restructured Basic Education Curriculum
Calumpang National High School implements the Basic Education Curriculum (BEC) as prescribed by the Department of Education of the Philippines.

K12 Basic Education Curriculum
Calumpang National High School implements the K12 Basic Education Curriculum (BEC) as prescribed by the Department of Education of the Philippines in 2010. The school offers quality education for Junior and Senior High School Students

4-Year TLE Specialization Program

Calumpang National High School offers a 4-Year TLE Specialization. During their first year high school, the Students of CNHS were asked to choose their field of study from the four branches of TLE: Information and Communications Technology (ICT), Industrial Arts (IA), Agricultural Arts (AA), and Home Economics (HE).

Information and Communications Technology
In ICT, freshmen take Basic Computer Education and Microsoft Office. Sophomores take Photo Editing. Juniors take Audio Editing and Video Production. Seniors take advance AutoCAD lectures which is used in architectural designs. To avoid counterfeiting, the school used Open-Source or Freeware software like GIMP and Audacity in photo and audio editing.

Industrial Arts
Drafting Technology is the main focus in Industrial Arts. The students start with the basics, including lettering, charcoal rendering and canvass painting. When they reach their second year in high school, the Mechanical Drafting will be introduced to them, followed by the Technical Drafting and Architectural Drafting.

Home Economics
In Home Economics, CNHS offers Food Technology, Dressmaking and Housekeeping. Students who take this field studies at the Home Economics Laboratory which is equipped with culinary materials, sewing machines, and a room for Housekeeping.

Agricultural Arts
Another specialization is the Agricultural and Fishery Arts. The TLE garden built last 2012 is dedicated for the AA students to have a separated place in performing various activities and outputs. At the end of each month, they harvest the garden wherein the harvested goods are transferred into school canteen.
Having the 4-Year TLE Specialization makes CNHS as one of the top performing schools in TLE.

Open High School Program
The OHSP is an alternative mode of secondary education that uses distance learning. It
caters to learners who are unable to attend the regular class program due to physical
impairment, work, financial difficulties, distance of home to school, and other justifiable and
legitimate reasons.

Continuous Improvement Program

Project CLICKs

Objectives
The purpose of this project entitled CLICKs or Computer Literate, Competent and Knowledgeable Students is to produce computer literate graduates. Specifically, it aims to:
Define computer literacy program to students
Teach basic computer education to all fourth year students
Maximize the use of ICT resources in CNHS

Strategies
Project CLICKs will be implemented by the month of July when students from different areas of specializations are already on the laboratory phase. It will follow the procedure listed: 
Orientation - Students will be given by the ICT teacher background information about computer and computer education.
Grouping - Students will be classified accordingly
Group 1- Advanced (students with background knowledge)
Group 2- Students with zero knowledge
Schedule and teaching method - Every Friday, peer teaching will be encouraged. ICT fourth year students, supervised by the ICT Coordinator of the school, will be assigned to one- on- one teaching of the following information:
Basic operation
Word processing
Microsoft excel
 Power point presentation
Software installation (for the Advanced)
Troubleshooting (for the Advanced)
Introduction to internet
Internet browsing

Assessment
Activities per grading period will be included as one of the activities in TLE.

Latest Achievements
For the past ten years, CNHS dominates in almost all TLE competitions including STEP-SDC in Laguna and CALABARZON. Until now, CNHS still remains their excellence in Technology. In 2014, Calumpang wipes-out all awards in the Eliminations Phase of Pasiklaban sa Pidabs (PSP), a skills competition conducted by Philippine Women’s University. This made CNHS as the over-all champion of the eliminations phase of the said competition. 20 students from that school will represent Laguna in the National Finals of PSP, competing with other provinces around Luzon and Visayas. This achievement was reported and recognized by Kevin Pamatmat in DZJV Radio CALABARZON last January 23, 2015.

Division, Regional, and National Achievements of CNHS (S.Y. 2013-2014 and 2014-2015)
 Qualifier:  PSP National Quiz Bee Competition [2015]
 Qualifier:  PSP National Street Dance Competition [2015]
 Qualifier:  Regional Schools Press Conference, School Paper – “Ang Calumpang” [2015] 
 Qualifier:  Regional Schools Press Conference, Feature Writing in Filipino [2015] 
 3rd Place:  AMA Hi Skul Idols Season 9 Road Show [2015]
 Over-all Champion:  Pasiklaban sa Pidabs: The First PWU Inter High School National Skills Competition, Eliminations Phase
 1st Place:  Pasiklaban sa Pidabs ICT Challenge [2014]
 1st Place: Pasiklaban sa Pidabs Business Administration Challenge [2014]
 1st Place:  Pasiklaban sa Pidabs HMS Challenge [2014]
 1st Place:  Pasiklaban sa Pidabs Music Video Production [2014]
 3rd Place:  Pasiklaban sa Pidabs Tourism Challenge [2014]
 3rd Place:  Pasiklaban sa Pidabs Dance Battle [2014]
 1st Place:  LU Inter High School Singing Competition [2014]
 1st Place:  Division Secondary Schools Press Conference – Feature Writing in Filipino [2014]
 2nd Place:  Regional Festival of Talents, Technolympics – Landscaping [2014]
 Qualifier:  Regional Festival of Talents, Technolympics – Mini Cabinet Construction [2014]
 2nd Place:  Division Technolympics – Techno-Quiz on Agricultural Arts [2014]
 1st Place:  Division Technolympics – Landscaping [2013] 
 1st Place:  Division Technolympics – Miniature Food Stall [2013] 
 1st Place:  Division Technolympics – Mini Cabinet Construction [2013]
 2nd Place:  Division Technolympics – Techno-Quiz on Agricultural Arts [2013]
 3rd Place:  Division Technolympics – Tshirt Printing [2013]
 3rd Place:  Regional Festival of Talents, Technolympics – Landscaping [2013] 
 2nd Place:  STI Hataw Sayaw [2013]

Sports
 CNHS Basketball Girls – 5-Time Defending Champion in the 3rd Unit of Laguna (2014)
 Zayuri Kirby Monteza – 1st Runner Up in Rhythmic Gymnastics, Southern Tagalog CALABARZON Athletic Association (STACAA) Meet (2011-2014)
 CNHS Gymnastics Team – Over-all Champion, Laguna Provincial Athletic Meet (2000 – 2010)

Campuses

Currently, Calumpang National High School has 2 campuses, the Main campus which is located at Brgy. Calumpang, Nagcarlan, Laguna. The other one is located at Brgy. Maravilla Nagcarlan, Laguna which is the Lowland Annex. Another campus is still under construction at Brgy. Kabubuhayan, Nagcarlan, Laguna.

Lowland Annex
Located at Barangay Maravilla Nagcarlan, Laguna, the Lowland National High School, annex of CNHS started its operation in 2002 and now offering a complete high school curriculum.

Stand Alone Senior High School
Founded at Kanluran Kabubuhayan, Nagcarlan, Laguna. It offers a program like Technology Vocational Livelihood (TVL) that includes specializations of Bread and Pastry (NCII), Food and Beverage Services (NCII), Local Guiding Sercvices (NCII) and Tourism Promotion Services (NCII)

Publications
Calumpang National High School has three official student publications:
 The Calumpang Post - Official Publication in English
 The Technotimes - Official Publication for Senior High School Updates
Since the 1st issue in 1972, The Achievers became the student’s voice wherein they can write their thoughts, comments, and opinions regarding the school concerns. In 2005, the first Filipino edition of student publication was introduced in the name of “The Achievers: Filipino Edition”. However, in 2008, the Laguna Secondary School Paper Advisers Association suggests to change the name of the Filipino School Paper. The title “The Achievers: Filipino Editions” was replaced with “Ang Calumpang”. Another publication is launched in 2013. Entitled “The Technotimes”, it brings updates regarding with the upcoming Senior High School Curriculum in 2016.
The 3 Publications has the following sections inside:
 News Page
 Editorial Page
 Features Page
 Literary Page
 Leisure Page
 Science and Technology Page
 Science and Health Page
 Sports Page
At the opening of the School Year 2014-2015, a Facebook page was launched in order for the students to get the latest updates in school’s activities.

South Flava

South Flava is the official dance troupe of Calumpang National High School. The group was formed last 2015 and was the successor of “D’ Midnight Crew” and “High Intensity” who also bags different awards in the past few years. The name was derived from “South Flavor” since they represent Southern Luzon in the PSP National Street Dance Competition held at Manila last February 27, 2015. PSP is one of the largest Nationwide Dance Competition for High School students. They also participate in different competitions and special numbers around Laguna wherein they receive different awards.

Achievements (As of 2015)

PSP National Street Dance Grand Finalist @ Malate, Manila
Over-all Champion - Pasiklaban sa Pidabs @ Sta. Cruz, Laguna
2nd Runner Up - AMA Hi Skul Idols Season 9 (Laguna Leg)

Members
Rodny Matienzo
Jomel Orillaza
Ronald Bueno
Ivan Renz Samia
Gilbert Jovellano
Rommel Sumague
Hannah Violanta
Weam Comendador

BJ Cabrera
Stephen Corvite
Theodoro Tapucay

Former members
Laica Mae Peria
Jennyrose Landerito
Patricia Ann Doria

Notable alumni

Paula Rich Bartolome - Binibining Pilipinas 2015 Candidate
Kevin Pamatmat - Field Correspondent at DZJV Radio CALABARZON and editor at Southern Tagalog Herald

References

External links 
Calumpang National High School
Official Website of Calumpang National High School Student Publication

High schools in Laguna (province)